The Sapphire Stakes was an American Thoroughbred horse race run from 1887 through 1909 at Sheepshead Bay Race Track in Sheepshead Bay, Brooklyn, New York. A race for two-year-old horses of either sex, it was run on dirt over a distance of five and one-half furlongs.

Historical notes
The inaugural running of the Sapphire Stakes took which took place on September 1, 1887 was won by Geraldine. Owned by Porter Ashe, ridden by Mike Kelly, and trained by Matthew Allen, Geraldine was described in a 1907 Daily Racing Form article as "one of the fastest sprinters of American turf history." After another two years of racing, the same publication expanded their assessment of Geraldine to "one of the fleetest mares that ever raced in this country."

Lady Navarre won the 1905 Sapphire Stakes and as a three-year-old continued to take on her male counterparts, winning the Tennessee Derby and finishing second to Sir Huon in the 1906 Kentucky Derby.

The End of a Race and of a Racetrack
Passage of the Hart–Agnew anti-betting legislation by the New York Legislature under Republican Governor Charles Evans Hughes led to a compete shutdown of racing in 1911 and 1912 in the state. A February 21, 1913 ruling by the New York Supreme Court, Appellate Division saw horse racing return in 1913. However, it was too late for the Sheepshead Bay horse racing facility and it never reopened.

Records
Speed record:
 1:06 1/5 @ 5.5 furlongs : Agile (1904)

Most wins by a jockey:
 3 – Eddie Dugan (1907, 1908, 1909)
 3 – Tommy Burns (1901, 1904, 1905)

Most wins by a trainer:
 5 – James G. Rowe Sr. (1889, 1892, 1897, 1900, 1902)

Most wins by an owner:
 2 – John E. Madden (1899, 1907)
 2 – James R. Keene (1900, 1902)

Winners

 † George Rose finished first in the 1896 running but was disqualified.

References

Flat horse races for two-year-olds
Discontinued horse races in New York City
Sheepshead Bay Race Track
Recurring sporting events established in 1887
Recurring sporting events disestablished in 1909
1887 establishments in New York (state)
1910 disestablishments in New York (state)